XHMD-FM is a radio station on 104.1 FM in León, Guanajuato. The station is owned by MVS Radio and carries its Exa FM pop format.

History
XHMD received its first concession on July 16, 1976. It has always been owned by MVS through several different concessionaires.

References

Radio stations in Guanajuato
Radio stations established in 1976
MVS Radio